Computeractive (sometimes written as Computeract!ve, to reflect the logo) is a fortnightly computer magazine published by Future plc in the United Kingdom.

History and profile
It was first published in February 1998 by VNU Business Publications, which was bought by Incisive Media in 2007. In February 2013 it was sold to Dennis Publishing. Its sister magazine is The Ultimate Guide series.

Based on fortnightly sales, confirmed by the UK's Audit Bureau of Circulation, Computeractive is the UK's best-selling computer magazine. The iPad app version of the magazine was launched in January 2012. An ebook version of Computeractive is provided by Zmags, although purchasers cannot read the magazine offline.

Future acquired Dennis Publishing and its computing division including Computeractive in 2021.

Contents
The magazine is split into the following sections:

News – summary of recent technology news 
Question of the Fortnight – essay on a chosen question
Protect Your Tech – summary of recent security news and latest preventative measures 
Letters – letters from readers 
Consumeractive – legal help for items bought online 
Grow Your Family Tree – tips for making family trees 
Best Free Software – reviews of free software 
Named & Shamed – warns readers of unsafe programs
Reviews – reviews of consumer hardware and software by the magazine's staff and various freelance journalists.
Workshops & Tips – demonstrates processes which can be done on a device 
What's All The Fuss About? – summarises a new technology 
Cover Features – special features 
Problems Solved – solved reader problems 
Reader Support – solves reader problems with software bought from the Computeractive Store 
Jargon Buster – explains jargon
Easy When You Know How – special workshop

References

External links
Computeractive homepage
Archived Computeractive magazines on the Internet Archive

1998 establishments in the United Kingdom
Biweekly magazines published in the United Kingdom
Computer magazines published in the United Kingdom
Magazines established in 1998
Mass media in Bath, Somerset